Khirbat Ism Allah was a Palestinian Arab hamlet in the Jerusalem Subdistrict, located 26 km west of Jerusalem.  It was depopulated during the 1948 Arab–Israeli War on July 17, 1948, by the Harel Brigade of Operation Dani. Khirbat Ism Allah was mostly destroyed with the exception of several deserted houses.

History
In 1883, the PEF's Survey of Western Palestine only noted “foundations" here.

British Mandate era
According to the 1931 census of Palestine, conducted in 1931 by the British Mandate authorities, Khirbat Ism Allah had a population of 18 inhabitants, in 4 houses.

In 1944 Zionist established Kfar Uria about 1,5 km NW of the village site, but not on village land.

In the 1945 statistics, Khirbat Ism Allah had a population of 20 Muslims,
with  a total of 568  dunums of land.  Of this, 3 dunams  were for  irrigable land or plantations, 485  for cereals,  while 80 dunams were classified as non-cultivable  land.

1948, aftermath
In 1992, the site was described: The caves in the northern part of the site still show evidence of their former use as dwellings; the remains of arched entrances are present. In the southern part of the site, a few ruined houses are surrounded by low stone walls. This area has been recently repopulated by a Jewish shepherd family that renovated and occupied one of the houses. The walled in area is used as a goat barn, and the entire area has become a grazing site for the family's flock. The family uses the village spring to the west.

References

Bibliography

External links
 Welcome To Ism Allah, Khirbat, Palestine Remembered
 Khirbat Ism Allah, Zochrot 
Survey of Western Palestine, Map 17:  IAA, Wikimedia commons 
Google Earth view

  

Arab villages depopulated during the 1948 Arab–Israeli War
District of Jerusalem